The 2008 Lower Austrian state election was held on 9 March 2008 to elect the members of the Landtag of Lower Austria.

The Austrian People's Party (ÖVP) retained its majority. The major opposition party, the Social Democratic Party of Austria (SPÖ), suffered substantial losses. The Freedom Party of Austria (FPÖ) partially recovered from its 2003 losses, more than doubling its voteshare and tripling its number of seats.

Background
The Lower Austrian constitution mandates that cabinet positions in the state government (state councillors) be allocated between parties proportionally in accordance with the share of votes won by each; this is known as Proporz. As such, the government is a perpetual coalition of all parties that qualify for at least one state councillor. After the 2003 election, the ÖVP had six councillors and the SPÖ three.

Electoral system
The 56 seats of the Landtag of Lower Austria are elected via open list proportional representation in a two-step process. The seats are distributed between twenty-one multi-member constituencies. For parties to receive any representation in the Landtag, they must either win at least one seat in a constituency directly, or clear a 4 percent state-wide electoral threshold. Seats are distributed in constituencies according to the Hare quota, with any remaining seats allocated using the D'Hondt method at the state level, to ensure overall proportionality between a party's vote share and its share of seats.

Contesting parties
The table below lists parties represented in the previous Landtag.

In addition to the parties already represented in the Landtag, five parties collected enough signatures to be placed on the ballot.

 Communist Party of Austria (KPÖ)
 The Christians (DCP) – on the ballot only in 20 constituencies
 Alliance for the Future of Austria (BZÖ) – on the ballot only in 17 constituencies
 List for our Lower Austria (LNÖ) – on the ballot only in 6 constituencies
 Animal Rights Party (TRP) – on the ballot only in Mödling

Results

Results by constituency

Preference votes
Alongside votes for a party, voters were able to cast a preferential votes for a candidate on the party list. The ten candidates with the most preferential votes were as follows:

References

2008 elections in Austria
State elections in Austria
March 2008 events in Europe